Hojamuhammet Akmuhammedowiç Toýçyýew (also Toychiyev, born ) is a Turkmen weightlifter, competing in the +105 kg category. He participated in the 2016 Olympics, and placed fifth and fourth at the 2014 and 2018 Asian Games, respectively. He won two medals at the Asian championships in 2016–2017.

Toýçyýew took up weightlifting in 2005. He has a degree in coaching from the National Institute of Sports and Tourism.

Major results

References

External links 
 

1992 births
Living people
Turkmenistan male weightlifters
Place of birth missing (living people)
Weightlifters at the 2016 Summer Olympics
Olympic weightlifters of Turkmenistan
Weightlifters at the 2014 Asian Games
Weightlifters at the 2018 Asian Games
Asian Games competitors for Turkmenistan
Weightlifters at the 2020 Summer Olympics
20th-century Turkmenistan people
21st-century Turkmenistan people